Nuthouse is the third album by the Canadian band Haywire, released in 1990. It went gold in Canada. The album was recorded in Norway with Bjorn Nessjo.

Critical reception
The Toronto Star wrote that "the band carries it off with enough energy to make the borrowings seem their own and with enough enthusiasm to overshadow the occasional lyrical lapses, the guitar hero moves and all the other hackneyed hard-rock trappings that the band has adopted."

Track listing

Personnel
 Paul MacAusland – vocals
 David Rashed – keyboards, backing vocals
 Marvin Birt – guitars, backing vocals
 Ronnie Switzer – bass
 Sean Kilbride – drums and percussion

References

Haywire (band) albums
1990 albums
Attic Records albums